"Jimmy Loves Mary-Anne" is a 1973 song written and composed by Elliot Lurie and recorded by Lurie's band, Looking Glass. It was the first track on their second and final album, Subway Serenade.  The title has also been spelled "Jimmy Loves Mary-Ann".

Background
The lyrics speak of hard-knock life in the inner city. Jimmy and Mary-Anne fall in love and, although they are street wise, dream of running away together and escaping their dead-end life.

Chart performance
The single reached number 33 on the Billboard Hot 100 chart, remaining in that position for two weeks. It spent a total of 15 weeks on the chart, just one week less than their number 1 hit, "Brandy." On the U.S. Cash Box Top 100, it peaked at number 31.  It was a bigger hit in Canada, reaching number 21.

Weekly charts

Year-end charts

Chicago radio superstation WLS, which gave "Jimmy Loves Mary-Anne" much airplay, ranked the song as the 72nd biggest hit of 1973.  It peaked at number 2 on their survey of October 13, 1973.

Cover versions
Mark Williams covered "Jimmy Loves Marianne" (note spelling) in 1975.  It was used as the B-side to his song, "Yesterday Was Just the Beginning of My Life", a number 1 hit single in New Zealand.
Josie Cotton covered "Jimmy Loves Maryann" in 1984, again with a variant spelling. It was her second chart single in the U.S.; it reached number 82 on the Billboard Hot 100.

References

External links
 
 

1973 songs
1973 singles
1984 singles
Epic Records singles
Elektra Records singles
Mark Williams (singer) songs
Song recordings produced by Arif Mardin
Looking Glass (band) songs